Health Protection Scotland (HPS) is the organisation that co-ordinates health protection in Scotland. It is part of Public Health Scotland.

HPS took over the functions of the Scottish Centre for Infection and Environmental Health (SCIEH) in November 2004. Other functions from National Services Scotland were also added.

HPS was succeeded by Public Health Scotland in April 2020. This new agency is a collaborative approach by both the Scottish Government and COSLA based on the Public Health Reform Programme.

Activities
HPS provides advice, support and information to health professionals, national government, local government, and the general public. It is responsible for developing and maintaining a range of websites.

Fit for Travel
HPS maintains "Fit for Travel", a website that provides travellers and their advisers with detailed information on health risks. The website offers general health advice, as well as specific advice on use of antimalarial tablets and vaccine recommendations. It includes a country by country index and specific information for different groups of travellers, such as backpackers, young children, pregnant women and the elderly, as well as those with medical conditions such as diabetes and asthma.

See also
 List of national public health agencies

References

External links
 
 Fit for Travel

NHS Scotland
2004 establishments in Scotland
Government agencies established in 2004